Brian L. Roberts (born June 28, 1959) is an American billionaire businessman, and the chairman and CEO of Comcast, an American company providing cable, entertainment, and communications products and services which was founded by his father, Ralph J. Roberts.

Early life and education
Roberts was born into a Jewish family in Philadelphia, Pennsylvania, the son of Ralph J. Roberts, the founder of Comcast Corporation, and Suzanne (née Fleisher), a former actress and playwright. His maternal grandfather, Alfred W. Fleisher, was a real estate investor and philanthropist who supported prison reform. Roberts graduated from the Germantown Academy and earned a Bachelor of Science degree from the Wharton School of the University of Pennsylvania in 1981, and immediately began working for Comcast.

Career
Roberts is chairman and CEO of Comcast Corporation. He was named President of Comcast Corporation in 1990 at only 31 years of age when the company had $657 million in annual revenue. Comcast Corporation’s annual revenue has since grown to $94.5 billion.

Roberts is chairman of the board of directors of the National Cable & Telecommunications Association (NCTA), and a former treasurer. Roberts served as Chairman of NCTA from 1995 to 1996, when the landmark deregulatory 1996 Telecommunications Act became law.

In 2000, Roberts acquired AT&T Broadband for $53.2 billion in stock and assumed debt. The deal allowed Comcast to become the largest cable operator in the world. In 2009, NBCUniversal was also acquired by Comcast.

In 2016, Roberts received US$28.6 million in compensation, and in 2020, his net worth was US$1.7 billion.

Awards and philanthropy
Institutional Investor Magazine named Roberts as its top vote-getter for three years in a row (2004–06) in the Cable & Satellite category of their America's Best CEOs annual survey; and named Comcast as one of America's Most Shareholder-Friendly Companies in 2006.

Roberts was the recipient of the 1994 Golden Plate Award of the American Academy of Achievement, the 2004 Humanitarian Award from the Simon Wiesenthal Center, and was the 2002 Walter Kaitz Foundation Honoree of the Year for his commitment to diversity in the cable industry. The Police Athletic League of Philadelphia honored Roberts with their 2002 award for his commitment to youth programs and community partnerships.

In 2001, Roberts was awarded the USC Shoah Foundation Institute's 2011 Ambassador for Humanity Award.

The Aileen K. and Brian L. Roberts  Foundation was one of the largest contributors to the restoration of the Alfred W. Fleisher Memorial Synagogue at Eastern State Penitentiary in Philadelphia, named in the honor of his maternal grandfather.

Maccabiah Games
An All-American squash player, Roberts competed in the Maccabiah Games in Israel, earning a gold medal with the U.S. Squash team in the 2005 Maccabiah Games, and silver medals in  the 1981 Maccabiah Games, the 1985 Maccabiah Games,  the 1997 Maccabiah Games, and the 2009 Maccabiah Games. On October 21, 2012, Roberts was honored by Maccabi USA as a 'Legend of the Maccabiah.'

Politics
Roberts was a founding co-chair of Philadelphia 2000, the nonpartisan host committee for the 2000 Republican National Convention. The Pennsylvania Report named Roberts to the 2003 "The Pennsylvania Report Power 75" list of influential figures in Pennsylvania politics, calling him "Pennsylvania’s most powerful businessman", and noted his influence with Pennsylvania Governor Ed Rendell.

In 2003, Roberts was named to the PoliticsPA list of politically influential individuals.

Since 2006, Roberts has donated more than $76,000 to Democratic candidates, and $13,500 to Republican candidates.

In December 2009, Roberts wrote a letter to President Barack Obama, endorsing the Patient Protection and Affordable Care Act.

Roberts is considered a supporter of the Democratic Party and supported Hillary Clinton in the 2016 United States presidential election.

Personal life
Roberts and his wife, Aileen Kennedy Roberts, live in Philadelphia and have three children, Sarah, Tucker and Amanda. Aileen is the chair of the Barnes Foundation.

In 2010, Roberts presented his mother, along with his brother Douglas and his father, Women's Image Network Awards Lifetime Achievement Award.

Roberts owns a 48 ft sloop and a 65 ft sloop, both designed by Sparkman & Stephens and named Aileen after his wife, which he sails while on vacation in his seasonal home on Martha's Vineyard. Roberts' son, Tucker, was appointed president of Overwatch League eSports team Philadelphia Fusion in January 2018, after Comcast and its sporting arm Comcast Spectacor paid a reported $20 million in franchise fees to participate in that league.

References

External links

1959 births
Living people
Businesspeople from Philadelphia
American chief executives of Fortune 500 companies
American corporate directors
American media executives
American male squash players
BNY Mellon
American chairpersons of corporations
Comcast people
Jewish American philanthropists
Maccabiah Games gold medalists for the United States
Maccabiah Games medalists in squash
Competitors at the 2009 Maccabiah Games
Wharton School of the University of Pennsylvania alumni
University of Pennsylvania alumni
American people of Russian-Jewish descent
American billionaires
Germantown Academy alumni
Brian L.
Competitors at the 1981 Maccabiah Games
Competitors at the 1985 Maccabiah Games
Competitors at the 1997 Maccabiah Games
Competitors at the 2005 Maccabiah Games